Taglish or Englog is code-switching and/or code-mixing in the use of Tagalog and English, the most common languages of the Philippines. The words Taglish and Englog are portmanteaux of the words Tagalog and English. The earliest use of the word Taglish dates back to 1973, while the less common form Tanglish is recorded from 1999.

Taglish is widely used in the Philippines, but is also used by Filipinos in overseas communities. It also has several variants, including coño English, jejenese and swardspeak.

Description
Taglish is very widespread in the Philippines and has become the de facto lingua franca among the urbanized and/or educated middle class. It is largely considered the "normal acceptable conversation style of speaking and writing" in informal settings. It is so widespread that a non-native speaker can be identified easily because they predominantly speak Tagalog, whereas a native speaker would switch freely with English.

According to the linguist Maria Lourdes S. Bautista, there are two contrasting types of code-switching in the Philippines: deficiency-driven and proficiency-driven. Deficiency-driven code-switching occurs when those who are not competent in one language must thus switch back to the language that is more familiar. That is common among younger children, as in the example below given by Bautista:

Proficiency-driven code-switching, on the other hand, occurs when a person is fully competent in both languages being used and can switch between them easily. That is the main type of code-switching in the islands. This example is given by Bautista, taken from an interview with the television journalist Jessica Soho:

Proficiency-driven code-switching is characterized by frequent switching of the Matrix Language (ML) between Tagalog and English, demonstrating the high proficiency of the speakers in both languages. There are also a wide range of strategies involved, including: the formation of bilingual verbs by the addition of prefixes, suffixes, and infixes (e.g. Nagse-sweat ako = "I was sweating"); switching at the morphological, word, phrasal, or clausal levels; and the use of system morphemes (like enclitics, conjunctions, etc.) within long stretches of ML content; and even the inversion of the verb–subject–object word order of Tagalog into the subject-verb-object order of English.

According to Bautista, the reason for this type of code-switching is what she termed "communicative efficiency" in which a speaker can "convey meaning using the most accurate, expressive, or succinct lexical items available to them." The linguist Rosalina Morales Goulet also enumerated several reasons for this type of code-switching. They are: "for precision, for transition, for comic effect, for atmosphere, to bridge or create social distance, for snob appeal, and for secrecy."

Characteristics
Taglish was originally a manner of speaking in Metro Manila involving the mixing of Tagalog/Filipino and English together. However, this practice has spread to other areas where both English and Tagalog/Filipino are spoken, including in areas where Tagalog is not the native language. It is characteristically a form of Tagalog/Filipino that mixes in English words, where Tagalog/Filipino is the substratum and English is the superstratum. Next to code-switching between sentences, clauses, and phrases in "pure" Tagalog and English, Taglish speech also code-mixes especially with sentences that follow the rules of Tagalog grammar with Tagalog syntax and morphology, but that occasionally employs English nouns and verbs in place of their Tagalog counterparts. Examples:

 
English verbs and even some nouns can be employed as Tagalog verb roots. This is done by the addition of one or more prefixes or infixes and by the doubling of the first sound of the starting form of the noun or verb, consistent with Tagalog morphology but usually retaining English spelling for the roots.

The English verb drive can be changed to the Tagalog word magda-drive meaning will drive (used in place of the Tagalog word magmamaneho). The English noun Internet can also be changed to the Tagalog word nag-Internet meaning have used the Internet.

Taglish also uses sentences of mixed English or Tagalog words and phrases. The conjunctions used to connect them can come from any of the two. Some examples include:

Because of its informal nature, experts of English and Tagalog discourage its use.

There are examples of modern books in Taglish: the adventure novel Bullet With A Name (2018) by Kirsten Nimwey, the love novel Aeternum Dream (2018) by Harkin Deximire, and more.

Forms

Swardspeak
Swardspeak is a kind of Taglish/Englog LGBT slang used by the LGBT demographic of the Philippines. It is a form of slang that uses words and terms primarily from Philippine English, Tagalog/Filipino, and/or Cebuano and Hiligaynon, and occasionally as well as Japanese, Korean, Chinese, Sanskrit, or other languages. Names of celebrities, fictional characters, and trademarks are also often used.

Coño English
Coño English or Colegiala English is a sociolect of Taglish/Englog that originated from the younger generations of affluent families in Manila. It is a form of Philippine English that mixes Tagalog/Filipino words, where opposite to Taglish, English is the substratum and Tagalog/Filipino is the superstratum.

The most common aspect of Coño English is the building of verbs by using the English word "make" with the root word of a Tagalog verb:

And adding the English conjunctions "like so" before using a Tagalog adjective to finish the sentence. Examples:

Sometimes, Tagalog interjections such as ano, naman, pa, na (or nah), no (or noh), a (or ha), e (or eh), and o (or oh) are placed to add emphasis. However, eh as an interjective in English is found chiefly in Canadian English, although stereotypically, and as a tag question or an expression of apathy or lack of enthusiasm in English varieties within the Western world including Australia and New Zealand. But especially in New Zealand, eh? is used much more than in Canada to elicit a response.

 (contractions from ) are used for questions and are added only to the end of a sentence. , is also used for questions and is placed in the front or the end.

"E"/"Eh" (added to answers to questions) and "o"/"oh" (for statements) are used for exclamations and are added to the front only.  (not yet; not yet done; to continue; still) and  can be placed in the middle or end.  (particle used to soften requests or put emphasis) is placed anywhere.

English adjectives are often replaced with Tagalog verbs. The language also occasionally uses Spanish words or Spanish loanwords from Filipino/Tagalog, like baño/banyo ("bathroom"), 
tostado ("toasted") and jamón ("ham").

Sometimes  is used instead of pare or along with it:

See also
Pseudo-anglicism
Code-switching
Bisalog, code-switching between Visayan and Tagalog
Bislish, code-switching between Visayan and English
Hokaglish, a mixed language of Philippine Hokkien, Tagalog and English

References

External links
Wikang Taglish, Kamulatang Taglish, article by Virgilio S. Almario

English language
Tagalog language
Code-switching